This is a list of butterflies of Djibouti. About nine species are known from Djibouti, none of which are endemic.

Pieridae

Pierinae
Colotis danae eupompe (Klug, 1829)
Colotis halimede (Klug, 1829)

Lycaenidae

Theclinae

Theclini
Iolaus tajoraca Walker, 1870
Deudorix livia (Klug, 1834)

Polyommatinae

Polyommatini
Tarucus rosacea (Austaut, 1885)

Nymphalidae

Satyrinae

Satyrini
Ypthima asterope (Klug, 1832)

Nymphalinae

Nymphalini
Hypolimnas bolina jacintha (Drury, [1773])

Hesperiidae

Pyrginae

Tagiadini
Caprona pillaana Wallengren, 1857

Carcharodini
Spialia doris (Walker, 1870)

References

Butterflies
Dj
Djibouti
Djibouti
Butterflies